Death Warmed Up (released in the Philippines as Dr. Evil: Part II) is a 1984 New Zealand science fiction horror splatter zombie film directed by David Blyth. It stars Michael Hurst, Margaret Umbers and Gary Day.

The film's plot centres around a young man named Michael Tucker (Hurst) seeking revenge against a mad scientist (Day), who years earlier caused him to kill his parents because he is creating zombies.

Plot
As a child, Michael Tucker (Michael Hurst) is used as a test subject for mind control drugs developed by evil scientist Dr. Howell (Gary Day), which cause him to unwittingly kill his parents. After spending seven years in a mental institution for the murders, Michael, his girlfriend Sandy (Margaret Umbers) and his two friends Jeannie (Norelle Scott) and Lucas (William Upjohn) use Michael's car, a black 1963 Ford Fairlane 500, to set out on a trip to a remote island on which Dr. Howell's clinic is located. Desperate for revenge, Michael is determined to infiltrate the scientist's base and kill him with no mercy. After tracking him down, he kills Howell's mob of mind controlled slaves who are both zombies, but in the resulting mayhem both Jeannie and Lucas are both killed. At last Michael proceeds to brutally kill Howell after repeatedly stabbing him in the stomach with a knife. After escaping from the clinic, Michael and Sandy return to their holiday home, only to discover that it caught fire. When Michael steps out to investigate the damage, he is struck by a falling electrical line and is electrocuted to death, leaving Sandy alone weeping over the loss of him as she's overcome with grief and starting to run.

Cast

Release and response

The film won the Grand Prix award at the 1984 Paris International Festival of Fantastic and Science-Fiction Film. Despite this, general reception to Death Warmed Up was mixed. Some of the covers of Death Warmed Up show a brain surgeon who is a skeleton who is about to use a hypodermic needle and a surgical knife to operate on the brain of a girl which doesn't represent any scene of the film.

In the Philippines, the film was released as Dr. Evil: Part II on May 1, 1987.

Banning in Australia
In 1985, the film was banned by the Australian Classification Board due to excessive violence. A censored version was later released.

References

External links

Death Warmed Up on Rotten Tomatoes
 

1984 films
1984 horror films
Films set in New Zealand
Films shot in New Zealand
Body horror films
1980s English-language films
New Zealand science fiction horror films
1980s exploitation films
1980s science fiction horror films
New Zealand splatter films